Viceroy may refer to:

Places
 Viceroy, Saskatchewan, a small hamlet located in the Canadian province of Saskatchewan
 Icon Brickell, a skyscraper complex in Miami, Florida, USA has a building known as Viceroy

Titles
 Viceroy, a gubernatorial title for the monarch-appointed governor of a country or province
 Viceroy of Kush, an official serving the Pharaoh of Egypt

Arts, entertainment, and media
 I Viceré, an 1894 novel by Federico De Roberto, translated to English as The Viceroys
 I Viceré (film), a 2007 film based on the De Roberto novel by director Roberto Faenza
 The Viceroys, a Jamaican rocksteady/reggae vocal trio

Brands and enterprises
 Viceroy (cigarette), a cigarette brand
 Vauxhall Viceroy, a large car sold in the United Kingdom

Ships
 , a British destroyer in commission in the Royal Navy from 1918 until the mid-1930s and from 1941 to 1945
 , a British ocean liner and later troop transport in service from 1929 until it sank in 1942

Other uses
 Viceroy (butterfly), a North American butterfly